The SQuirreL SQL Client is a database administration tool. It uses JDBC to allow users to explore and interact with databases via a JDBC driver.  It provides an editor that offers code completion and syntax highlighting for standard SQL.  It also provides a plugin architecture that allows plugin writers to modify much of the application's behavior to provide database-specific functionality or features that are database-independent. As this desktop application is written entirely in Java with Swing UI components, it should run on any platform that has a JVM.

SQuirreL SQL Client is free as open source software that is distributed under the GNU Lesser General Public License.

Feature summary 

 Object Tree allows for browsing database objects such as catalogs, schemas, tables, triggers, views, sequences, procedures, UDTs, etc.
 The SQL Editor, based on RSyntaxTextArea by fifesoft.com, provides syntax highlighting.  It can open, create, save and execute files containing SQL statements.
 SQuirreL supports simultaneous sessions with multiple databases. This allows comparing data and sharing SQL statements between databases.
 SQuirreL runs on any platform that has a JVM.
 A plugin architecture facilitates database vendor-specific extensions (information or actions not available using standard JDBC)
 Translations for the user interface exist in: (Bulgarian, Brazilian Portuguese, Chinese, Czech, French, German, Italian, Japanese, Polish, Spanish, Russian).
 Graph capabilities can generate charts showing table relationships.
 Bookmarks - user-defined code templates. SQuirreL comes with predefined example bookmarks for the most common SQL and DDL statements.

History 

The SQuirreL SQL project was developed by a team of Java developers around the world and led by Colin Bell.  It has been hosted as a SourceForge project since 2001, and was still under active development in 2020.

Supported databases 

 Axion Java RDBMS.
 Apache Derby
 ClickHouse
 Fujitsu Siemens SESAM/SQL-Server with the SESAM/SQL JDBC driver
 Firebird with the JayBird JCA/JDBC Driver
 Hypersonic SQL
 H2 (DBMS)
 IBM Db2 for Linux, IBM i and Windows
 Informix
 Ingres (and OpenIngres)
 InstantDB
 InterBase
 Mckoi SQL Database
 Microsoft Access with the JDBC/ODBC bridge.
 Microsoft SQL Server
 Mimer SQL
 MonetDB
 MySQL
 Netezza
 Oracle Database 8i, 9i, 10g, 11g
 Pointbase
 PostgreSQL 7.1.3 and higher
 SAPDB
 Sybase
 Sunopsis XML Driver (JDBC Edition)
 Teradata Warehouse
 Vertica Analytic Database

See also 

 SQL
 Comparison of database tools

References

External links 
 

Database administration tools
Java platform software
SQL
Firebird (database server)
Interbase
Oracle database tools
Microsoft database software
Sybase
MySQL